The table below lists the decisions (known as reasons) delivered from the bench by the Supreme Court of Canada during 2017. The table illustrates what reasons were filed by each justice in each case, and which justices joined each reason.

Reasons 

On December 15, 2017, Chief Justice Beverley McLachlin retired. Richard Wagner was sworn in as Chief Justice on December 18, 2017.

References

External links 
 2017 decisions: CanLII, LexUM

Supreme Court of Canada reasons by year